"Norma Jean Riley" is a song written by Rob Honey, Monty Powell and Dan Truman, and recorded by American country music group Diamond Rio. It was released on March 23, 1992 as the fourth single from their self-titled album.  Unlike the four other singles released from the album, a music video was not made for this song.

Content
"Norma Jean Riley" is a very upbeat, bluegrass influenced song where the narrator is pining for Norma Jean Riley's affections. In each verse, he comes up with different ways to get her attention. By the time the song is over, he is planning to propose to her.

The song was originally titled "Pretty Little Lady" until co-writer and producer Monty Powell suggested that song would be improved if the female focus had a name.

Chart performance
The song peaked at number 2 on The Billboard Hot Country Songs chart and number 3 on Canada's RPM country chart.

Year-end charts

References

1992 singles
Diamond Rio songs
Arista Nashville singles
Songs written by Monty Powell
1991 songs